Ezhuvanthala is a small village in Nellaya Panchayat of Palakkad district in the state of Kerala in India.

References

Villages in Palakkad district